Bow Street Magistrates' Court became one of the most famous magistrates' court in England. Over its 266-year existence it occupied various buildings on Bow Street in Central London, immediately north-east of Covent Garden. It closed in 2006 and its work moved to a set of four magistrates' courts: Westminster, Camberwell Green, Highbury Corner and the City of Westminster Magistrates' Court. The senior magistrate at Bow Street until 2000 was the Chief Metropolitan Stipendiary Magistrate.

The building, which is grade II listed, is now a hotel and police museum.

History

The first court at Bow Street was established in 1740, when Colonel Sir Thomas de Veil, a Westminster justice, sat as a magistrate in his home at number 4. De Veil was succeeded by novelist and playwright Henry Fielding in 1747. He was appointed a magistrate for the City of Westminster in 1748, at a time when the problem of gin consumption and resultant crime was at its height. There were eight licensed premises in the street and Fielding reported that every fourth house in Covent Garden was a gin shop. In 1749, in response to calls to find an effective means to tackle increasing crime and disorder, Fielding brought together eight reliable constables, known as "Mr Fielding's People", who soon gained a reputation for honesty and efficiency in their pursuit of criminals. The constables came to be known as the Bow Street Runners. Fielding's blind half-brother, Sir John Fielding (known as the "Blind Beak of Bow Street"), succeeded his brother as magistrate in 1754 and refined the patrol into the first truly effective police force for the capital. The early 19th century saw a dramatic increase in number and scope of the police based at Bow Street with the 1805 formation of the Bow Street Horse Patrole, which covered to the edge of London and was the first uniformed police unit in Britain, and in 1821 the Dismounted Horse Patrole which covered suburban areas.

When the Metropolitan Police Service was established in 1829, a station house was soon sited at numbers 25 and 27.

In 1876 the Duke of Bedford let a site on the eastern side of Bow Street to the Commissioners of HM Works and Public Buildings for a new magistrates' court and the police station, at an annual rent of £100. Work on the current building to a design by the Office of Works' surveyor Sir John Taylor began in 1878 and was completed in 1881—the date 1879 in the stonework above the door of the present building is when it had been hoped that work would finish. Historic England's listing entry describes the architectural style as "dignified, eclectic Graeco-Roman with some slightly Vanbrughian details, rather in the Pennethorne manner."

In 1878 gazetteer Walter Thornbury published that the establishment, still called generally a Magistrates' House, consisted of "three magistrates, each attending two days in a week". He added:

In its later years, the court housed the office of the Senior District Judge (Magistrates' Courts), who heard high-profile matters, such as extradition cases or those involving eminent public figures.

Closure and redevelopment

The listed status of the building, containing both the court and the police station, meant that it was not economic to update it to modern standards. It was accordingly considered for closure, enabling better use of a building that faces the front of the Royal Opera House.

The police station closed in 1992, and in 2004 the court was put up for sale by its joint owners, the Greater London Magistrates' Courts Authority and the Metropolitan Police Authority. In July 2005 the site was bought by property developer Gerry Barrett to convert into a boutique hotel, and the court closed on 14 July 2006. The final case was that of Jason John Handy, a 33-year-old alcoholic-vagrant who was accused of breaching his anti-social behaviour order. Other cases on the last day included beggars, shoplifters, illegal minicab drivers and a terrorist hearing—the first of its kind—in which a terror suspect was accused of breaching his control order. The final day was heavily attended by members of the press. The court's remaining cases moved to Horseferry Road Magistrates' Court which itself closed in 2011, when its work moved to the old Marylebone Court House and renamed Westminster Magistrates' Court.

In 2008 the Bow Street site was sold to Austrian developers who obtained planning permission for a hotel and police museum, while maintaining the facade of the old court building. In October 2016 the site was sold on again, to the UK arm of Qatari investment firm BTC, who used the existing planning permission. A 91-room hotel, run by the New York based NoMad chain, opened in May 2021, as did a public restaurant and a museum of local police history.

Famous defendants
Many famous accused people have passed through Bow Street, often before committal for trial at the Central Criminal Court, Old Bailey or at other Crown Court centres, or when being held on extradition or terrorism charges. These include:

 Giacomo Casanova
 Roger Casement
 Dr Crippen
 Abu Hamza al-Masri
 William Joyce
 The Kray twins
 Emmeline and Christabel Pankhurst
 General Pinochet
 John Cyril Porte
 Oscar Wilde

See also

 Battle of Bow Street
 Bow Street
 Bow Street Police Museum
 Bow Street Runners
 Royal Courts of Justice
 Old Bailey, Central Criminal Court
 City of Westminster Magistrates' Court

References

External links

 Map: Bow Street
 Bow Street Police Museum

Legal buildings in London
Grade II listed buildings in the City of Westminster
Former buildings and structures in the City of Westminster
1740 establishments in England
2006 disestablishments in England
Court buildings in London
Magistrates' courts in England and Wales
Former courthouses in England